Manuel Bonnet is a French author and an award-winning actor who primarily appears in French cinema and television.

Career 
He studied at the Conservatoire national supérieur d'art dramatique in Paris from 1970–73 and has had many roles and cameo parts in film and TV over more than 30 years, mostly in France.

Bonnet made a guest appearance on Highlander: The Series as Cavalry Captain in an episode titled Unholy Alliance: Part 2 and also the French foreign subtitled film Les Fautes d'orthographe. He also appeared in Thomas the Falconer alongside actors and actresses like Brano Holicek, Juraj Kukura, Jiri Langmajer and Jaroslav Zvasta.

A direct descendant of the photographic pioneer Nicéphore Niépce, Manuel Bonnet was the co-writer, with Jean-Louis Marignier of the book “Niépce, correspondance et papiers”, published by Maison Nicéphore Niépce in 2003, and the initiator of the celebrations in 2007 of the bicentennial of the invention of the Pyreolophore, an early internal combustion engine designed by the Niépce brothers.

In the course of research made by the Swedish filmmaker Vilgot Sjöman on Alfred Nobel, the study by Manuel Bonnet of Nobel's French associate, Paul Barbe, found recognition through the creation of files bearing his name in the archives of the Nobel institute in Stockholm.

He has also contributed to the book by Max Lavigne entitled : "Chantecoq, De la Cité Royale à la Commune républicaine" in 1996.

Appearances

Theatre
 Dix Petits Negres. Directed By Jacqueline Bœuf
  Le Temps des Gitans. Directed By Emir Kusturica (Opéra De Paris)
 Amadeus. Directed by Stéphane Hillel
 Entrez sans Frapper. Directed By Raymond Acquaviva
 La Boutique au Coin De La Rue. Directed By Jean-Jacques Zilbermann
 Grison Iv. Directed By G. Savoisien
 Cinema Parlant. Directed By Daniel Colas
 Drôle de Gouter. Directed By Gérard Maro
 Romeo et Juliette. Directed By Jean-Paul Lucet
 Britannicus. Directed By Simone Beaudoin
 Andromaque. Directed By Pierre Santini
 Les Temps Difficiles. Directed By Pierre Dux
 Lenine. Directed By Claude Vermorel
 Les Fourberies de Scapin. Directed by Pierre Boutron
 Trio Pour Deux Canaris. Directed by François Duval
 La Comedie Humaine. Directed By Paul-Emile Deiber
 L'aiglon. Directed By Jean-Laurent Cochet

Television 
 L’école Du Pouvoir. Director - Raoul Peck
 Memento. Director - Patrick Poubel
 Les Intouchables. Director - Benoît D’aubert
 La Vie Devant Nous, Cinq Ans Apres. Director - Laura Muscardin
 Vrai Comme Un Reve. Director - Christophe Otzenberger
 Les Enfants D'orion. Director - Philippe Venault
 Voici Venir L'orage. Director - Nina Companeez
 Securite Interieure. Director - Patrick Grandperret
 Max Jacob. Director - Gabriel Aghion
 Ris -  Police Scientifique (Dépendances). Director - Klaus Biderman
 La Vallee. Director - Raoul Peck
 Commissaire Valence. Director - Denis Amar
 Plus Belle La Vie. Director - Jean-Pierre Igoux.
 Le Proces De Bobigny. Director - François Luciani.
 Denonciation Calomnieuse. Director - Dominique Ladoge
 Jusqu’au Bout. Director - Maurice Failevic
 Les Bourreaux De L'ombre (Navarro). Director - Jean Sagols
 Biarritz. Director - Olivier Guignard
 Les Perles Du Pacifique. Director - G. Bannier / T. Guerrier / Didier Delaitre
 Les Filles De Vincennes. Director - Thierry Binisti
 Ciel D’orage. Director - Paolo Barzman
 Factures Sociales (Les Bœufs Carottes). Director - Gérard Cuq
 La Nouvelle Tribu. Director - Roger Vadim
 Mon Pere Avait Raison. Director - Roger Vadim
 Flairs Ennemis. Director - Robin Davis
 Les Alsaciens. Director - Michel Favart
 Tabou. Director - Alain Robak
 Cas De Divorce. Director - G. Espinasse / A. Lombardi
 Tango. Director - Jacques Payette
 Chasseurs De Loups. Director - Didier Albert
 Highlander: The Series - Unholy Alliance 2. Director - P. Ellis
 Christmas Carol (1984) – Director – Francis Junek
 Seconde B. Director - Christiane Spiero
 La Devoyee. Director - Jacques Audoir
 Repetition D’un Meurtre. Director - Jacques Audoir
 Pas De Noel Pour Sarah-Lou. Director - Geneviève Strina
 L'or Et Le Papier. Director - Nino Monti
 La Patrie En Danger. Director - J.D. De La Rochefoucauld
 La Vie En Couleur. Director - J. Doniol Valcroze
 La Danse De Salome. Director - Jacques Ordines
 L'ete De La Revolution. Director - Lazare Iglesis
 L'affaire Saint Romans. Director - Michel Wyn
 Arrets Frequents. Director - Gérard Marx
 Celine. Director - Josée Dayan
 Les Pardaillan. Director - Josée Dayan
 Madame Et Ses Flics. Director - R. Bernard
 Le Vent Du Large. Director - M. Bertin
 Le Chant De Noel. Director - Pierre Boutron
 Laure Et Adriani. Director - Gérard Espinasse
 La Prison Sur La Mer. Director - Jacques Ordines
 Pour Le Plaisir. Director - Pascal Goethals
 Les Dames A La Licorne. Director - Lazare Iglesis
 Je Tue Il. Director - Pierre Boutron
 Le Danseur Mondain. Director - Gérard Espinasse
 Crapotte. Director - Agnès Delarive
 Le Nœud De Viperes. Director - Jacques Trebouta
 Louis Xi. Director - Alexandre Astruc
 Lazare Carnot. Director - Jean-François Delassus
 Auteurs De Folie. Director - Claude Fayard
 Les Années Dillusion. Director - Pierre Matteuzi
 Chroniques Martiennes. Director - Kammerscheit
 L'âge En Fleur. Director - Philippe Agostini

 Cinema 
 15 Ans Et Demi. Director - François Desagnat & Thomas Sorriaux
 Ça Se Soigne ? Director - Laurent Chouchan
 Alfred.  Director – Vilgot Sjöman.
 Le Dernier Gang. Director - Ariel Zeitoun
 Perds Pas La Boule. Director - Maria Pia Crapanzano
 Mort A L'ecran. Director - Alexis Ferrebeuf
 Les Fautes D'orthographe. Director - Jean-Jacques Zilbermann
 Rue Des Plaisirs. Director - Patrice Leconte
 Sokoliar Tomas. Director - Vaclav Vorlicek
 L'affaire. Director - Sergio Gobbi
 In The Shadow Of The Sandcastles. Director - Philippe Blot
 Funny Boy. Director - Christian Le Hemonet
 Sibylle. Director - Robert Cappa

 External links 
Webpage on the Conservatoire site 
Contact details 
More info on his roles 

 Notes This article is based on the original and the equivalent article from the French Wikipedia, consulted on December 23rd 2008.''

Living people
Year of birth missing (living people)
French male stage actors
French male television actors
French male film actors
French National Academy of Dramatic Arts alumni